Balkusan (formerly called Balgusan, Balkasun) is a village in Ermenek district of Karaman Province, Turkey. The population of the town is 211 as of 2014. The origin of the village residents are Turkmens of Afshar tribe who had migrated from the Central Asia in the Medieval Age. The name of the village may refer to Balasagun, a historical city in Kyrgyzstan. The village was a more important place in the Medieval Age. The tombs of Karaman Bey and Mahmut Bey, beys of Karamanoğlu beylik are in the village. Main economic activity of the village is agriculture. Beehiving is another important activity.

References

Villages in Ermenek District